The 2004 World Team Table Tennis Championships was held at the Qatar International Exhibition Center in Doha, Qatar from March 1 to March 7, 2004. This decision was announced in May 2001. It is the 47th edition to be contested.

Medal summary

Medal table

Events

References

ITTF website
ITTF Statistics

World Table Tennis Championships
World Table Tennis Championships
World Table Tennis Championships
World Table Tennis Championships
Table tennis competitions in Qatar